Charles-Louis-Gaspard-Gabriel de Salviac, baron de Viel Castel (14 October 1800, in Paris – 6 October 1887, in Paris) was a French historian and diplomat.  He was a great-nephew of Mirabeau via his mother, and the elder brother of Horace de Viel-Castel.

Biography
In 1818 he entered the diplomatic service.  In 1829 he returned to France's ministry of foreign affairs, becoming its sous-directeur then its director of political affairs, but his career was interrupted by his offers of resignation after the revolutions of 1830 and 1848, which he made final after the coup of 1851.  He was elected a member of the Académie française in 1878

Main works 
Essai historique sur les deux Pitt (1845-1846), on Pitt the Elder and Pitt the Younger
Histoire de la Restauration (20 volumes, 1860-1878), on the Bourbon Restoration
Essai sur le théâtre espagnol (2 volumes, 1882), on Spanish theatre
Histoire de la Restauration

External links 
 
 Biography on the Académie française site

1800 births
1887 deaths
Writers from Paris
19th-century French diplomats
19th-century French historians
Politicians of the July Monarchy
Members of the Académie Française
People of the French Second Republic
People of the Second French Empire
Barons of France
Politicians of the Bourbon Restoration
French male writers
19th-century male writers